The 2011 Odlum Brown Vancouver Open was a professional tennis tournament played on outdoor hard courts. It was the 7th edition, for men, and 10th edition, for women, of the tournament and part of the 2011 ATP Challenger Tour and the 2011 ITF Women's Circuit, offering totals of $100,000, for men, and $100,000, for women, in prize money. It took place in West Vancouver, British Columbia, Canada between August 1 and August 7, 2011.

Men's singles main-draw entrants

Seeds

1 Rankings are as of July 25, 2011

Other entrants
The following players received wildcards into the singles main draw:
 Steve Johnson
 Bradley Klahn
 Daniel Kosakowski
 David Martin

The following players received entry from the qualifying draw:
 Luka Gregorc
 Toshihide Matsui
 Michael McClune
 Travis Rettenmaier

Women's singles main-draw entrants

Seeds

1 Rankings are as of August 1, 2011

Other entrants
The following players received wildcards into the singles main draw:
 Gail Brodsky
 Eugenie Bouchard
 Gabriela Dabrowski
 Amanda Fink

The following players received entry from the qualifying draw:
 Madison Brengle
 Casey Dellacqua
 Julia Glushko
 Olivia Rogowska

Champions

Men's singles

 James Ward def.  Robby Ginepri, 7–5, 6–4

Women's singles

 Aleksandra Wozniak def.  Jamie Hampton, 6–3, 6–1

Men's doubles

 Treat Conrad Huey /  Travis Parrott def.  Jordan Kerr /  David Martin, 6–2, 1–6, [16–14]

Women's doubles

 Karolína Plíšková /  Kristýna Plíšková def.  Jamie Hampton /  Noppawan Lertcheewakarn, 5–7, 6–2, [10–2]

External links
Official website

Odlum Brown Vancouver Open
Odlum Brown Vancouver Open
Vancouver Open
Odlum Brown Vancouver Open
Odlum Brown Vancouver Open